"1950" is the debut single recorded by American singer-songwriter King Princess. It was released on February 23, 2018, by Zelig Recordings as the lead single from her debut EP, titled Make My Bed. "1950" is a tribute to the 1952 novel The Price of Salt by Patricia Highsmith. The song was performed on The Late Show with Stephen Colbert and Saturday Night Live on November 8 and November 23, 2019 alongside her other single "Hit the Back".

Music video
The music video and the single were both released on February 23, 2018. The video was directed by Clare Gillen. As of November 2021, it has over 19 million views on YouTube.

Personnel
Credits adapted from Tidal.
King Princess – vocals, songwriting, production, programming, bass
Mike Malchicoff – production
Nick Long – songwriting
Dave Kutch – mastering engineer
Mike Malchicoff – recording engineer, mixing engineer
Tommy Brenneck – mixing engineer

Charts

Certifications

Release history

In other media
The 2020 Academy Award-winning animated short If Anything Happens I Love You featured the song.

References

Songs about nostalgia
2018 singles
2018 songs
King Princess songs